Danielle McCray (born October 8, 1987) is an American professional basketball player. She was selected seventh overall in the 2010 WNBA Draft by the Connecticut Sun. She played collegiately for the Kansas Jayhawks where she was named a second-team All-American during her senior season. McCray is the highest-picked player in KU's history.

Early life
McCray was born in Boynton Beach, Florida, and as a young child, her family moved to Olathe, Kansas. McCray attended Olathe East High School and was an All-State selection. During her senior season, she accepted an athletic scholarship to the University of Kansas.

Collegiate career
McCray concluded her career ranked in the top 10 of nine categories — including fourth in all-time scoring with 1,934 points — and with a good deal of hardware.

Kansas statistics

Source

USA Basketball
McCray was named a member of the team representing the US at the 2009 World University Games held in Belgrade, Serbia. The team won all seven games to earn the gold medal. McCray led the team in scoring in the semi-final game against Australia, and was the second leading scorer overall, averaging 12.0 points per game

WNBA
Danielle McCray was selected 7th overall by the Connecticut Sun in the 2010 WNBA Draft. According to several analysts, McCray would have been selected in the top four had she not suffered an ACL injury she suffered on February 2, 2010. McCray's pick makes her the highest-selected player in the WNBA Draft in KU's history. Additionally, her selection makes her the first Jayhawk drafted into the WNBA since Jaclyn Johnson was taken by the Orlando Miracle with the 42nd pick in the 2001 WNBA Draft.

References

1987 births
Living people
American women's basketball players
Basketball players from Florida
Basketball players from Kansas
Connecticut Sun draft picks
Connecticut Sun players
Forwards (basketball)
Guards (basketball)
Kansas Jayhawks women's basketball players
Sportspeople from Olathe, Kansas
Sportspeople from Boynton Beach, Florida
Universiade gold medalists for the United States
Universiade medalists in basketball
Medalists at the 2009 Summer Universiade